Countess Anna Artemevna Buturlina, née Vorontsova (Воронцова; 17771854) was a Russian artist, noblewoman, and artist's model.

Family and early life
Anna Vorontsova was born in 1777, the second daughter of Count Artemiy Ivanovich Vorontsov and his wife Countess Praskovya Feodorovna Kvashnina-Samarina. She was the second cousin of M. A. Gannibal, a relation of Abram Gannibal. In 1793 Anna married her second cousin, Count , a noted bibliophile and director of the Hermitage Museum. With her husband she had two sons, Pyotr and Mikhail, and three daughters, Maria, Elizaveta and Elena, as well as several other children who died in infancy.

Artistic life
Contemporaries noted the mind and education of the countess. She loved to draw, was engaged in painting, particularly miniatures on ivory. A self-portrait in miniature is held in the collections of the Hermitage Museum. An early portrait by Dmitry Levitzky is held in the collections of the Russian Museum. Another portrait, by  after an earlier work by Vladimir Borovikovsky, is held by the State Tretyakov Gallery in Moscow.

Gallery

Later life
In Saint Petersburg she was visited by Count Joseph de Maistre, the envoy of the King of Sardinia to the Russian court. She was also visited by Pater Jourdan of the Jesuit Order between 1813 and 1814. This association caused Countess Buturlina to consider converting to Catholicism. She moved with her family to Italy in 1817, residing mainly in Florence, and converting to Catholicism in 1825.

References

1777 births
1854 deaths
Converts to Roman Catholicism
Converts to Roman Catholicism from Eastern Orthodoxy
Former Russian Orthodox Christians
Russian Roman Catholics
Emigrants from the Russian Empire to Italy